Manuel Padilla Jr. (July 13, 1955 – January 29, 2008) was an American child actor who got into films at age 8. He is best remembered for playing Jai on Ron Ely's Tarzan television series of the mid to late 1960s. He also co-starred with Mike Henry in two mid-1960's "Tarzan" feature films. As a young adult, he appeared in American Graffiti (1973) as well as its 1979 sequel. He also appeared in episodes of Rawhide, Bonanza, Gunsmoke, Happy Days and The Flying Nun. His last role was a small part in Brian De Palma's 1983 film Scarface.

Manuel Padilla Jr. died from colon cancer on January 29, 2008, at age 52. At the time of his death, he told people he had almost no assets whatsoever.

Filmography

See also
List of former child actors from the United States

References

External links
 
 
  Padilla in American Graffiti

1955 births
2008 deaths
20th-century American male actors
American male actors of Mexican descent
Male actors from Los Angeles
American male child actors
American male film actors
American male television actors